"Stop This Game" is a song by American rock band Cheap Trick, released in 1980 as the lead single from their fifth studio album All Shook Up. It was written by Rick Nielsen and Robin Zander, and produced by George Martin. "Stop This Game" reached No. 48 on the US Billboard Hot 100 and No. 32 on the Canadian RPM Top Singles.

Critical reception
Upon release, Billboard described the song as one that "starts off on a mellow note before some thunderous guitar licks take charge and the tune becomes a forceful rocker. Lead vocals are full of gut level intensity." In a review of All Shook Up, Billboard described the song as an "epic, mid-tempo rocker". David Fricke of Rolling Stone described the song as one of the album's "clever pop curves", describing it as recalling The Who and noting the "dense, pseudo-ELO orchestration".  Record World said of it that "Robin Zander provides one of his finest vocal efforts on this insistent rocker." In a retrospective review of the album, Stewart Mason of AllMusic recommended the song by selecting it as an AMG Pick Track.

The song did best in the group's home base of northern Illinois, where it reached #27 on superstation WLS-AM in Chicago.  It spent 14 weeks in the Top 40 on their weekly survey.

Track listing
7" single
"Stop This Game" – 3:45
"Who D'King" – 2:16

7" single (US promo)
"Stop This Game" – 3:50
"Stop This Game" – 3:50

Personnel
 Robin Zander – lead vocals, rhythm guitar
 Rick Nielsen – lead guitar, backing vocals
 Tom Petersson – bass guitar, backing vocals
 Bun E. Carlos – drums, percussion

Additional personnel 
 George Martin - producer, arranger, piano
 Geoff Emerick – engineer
 Nigel Walker – assistant engineer
 Tony George – assistant engineer
 George Marino – mastering

Chart performance

References

1980 songs
1980 singles
Cheap Trick songs
Epic Records singles
Songs written by Rick Nielsen
Songs written by Robin Zander
Song recordings produced by George Martin